is the 42nd single by Japanese entertainer Akina Nakamori. Written by Nakamori and Tetsurō Oda, the single was released on April 30, 2003, by Universal Music Japan. It was also the lead single from her 21st studio album I Hope So.

Background 
"Days" was the first single written by Nakamori since her 1995 release "Tokyo Rose". It was used as the ending theme of the TV Tokyo drama series .

The B-side is "Hana", which was used as the theme song of the NHK series .

The single includes the bonus track , originally recorded by Seiko Matsuda in 1986. The song is included in Nakamori's cover album Zero Album: Utahime 2.

Chart performance 
"Days" peaked at No. 30 on Oricon's weekly singles chart and sold over 10,100 copies.

Track listing

Charts

References

External links 
 
 
 

2003 singles
2003 songs
Akina Nakamori songs
Japanese-language songs
Japanese television drama theme songs
Songs written by Tetsurō Oda
Universal Music Japan singles